The Inspection générale des carrières (IGC) is the organisation which administers, controls and maintains the mines of Paris and catacombs of Paris. It was founded by royal decree of Louis XVI on 4 April 1777 as the 'Service des carrières du département de la Seine'.

List of Inspectors General to 1911

References

External links (in French) 
 
 L'Atlas souterrain de la ville de Paris de 1976 à nos jours
 L'histoire de l'IGC
 Atlas des carrières de Paris et planches IGC
 Inspection générale des xarrières
 Les plaques indicatives de l'IGC
 Les inscriptions souterraines

History of Paris
Organizations established in 1777
1777 establishments in France